Geoalkalibacter subterraneus  is a Fe(III)-reducing, Mn(IV)-reducing, strictly anaerobic,  bacterium from the genus of Geoalkalibacter which has been isolated from the water from the Redwash oilfield from Redwash in the United States.

References

External links
 Geoalkalibacter subterraneus microbewiki

 

Desulfuromonadales
Bacteria described in 2009